Matt Wolf may refer to:
 Matt Wolf (video game designer)
 Matt Wolf (filmmaker)